The Pico do Jabre State Park is a state park in the state of Paraíba, Brazil.
It protects the highest peak in northeast Brazil, with a unique montane forest ecosystem combining Atlantic Forest and caatinga elements.

Location

The Pico do Jabre State Park is in the Paraíba municipalities of Matureia and Mãe d'Água.
Most of the park is in Matureia.

History

Objectives were to reconcile protection of fauna, flora and landscape with scientific research and recreation.
It is administered by the Environmental Management Superintendency of Paraíba (Sudema).

In April 2016 the public prosecutor's office filed a public civil action against the cellular operators Tim, Oi and Embratel, and against 24 owners of property on the Pico do Jabre.
The prosecutor said that the property owners had ignored the fact that the area had been declared of public utility for the purpose of expropriation, and had continued illegal construction, causing irreversible environmental damage to a unique ecosystem. Among other actions, the action called for demolition of all buildings and structures in the area of permanent preservation, followed by recovery of the environment and payment for damages.

Environment

The region has a Köppen climate classification of Aw: hot and humid, with rain in the summer and autumn.
Vegetation includes humid forest species with elements of caatinga, which predominate in the surroundings.
The vegetation is the only example of montane forest in the Atlantic Forest domain of Paraíba.
Species such as angico (Mimosoideae), Cedrus, Amburana, quixabeira (Sideroxylon obtusifolium) and aroeira (Anacardiaceae) stand out.

Notes

Sources

State parks of Brazil
Protected areas established in 1992
1992 establishments in Brazil
Protected areas of Paraíba